The gymnastics competitions at the 2017 Southeast Asian Games in Kuala Lumpur were held at MATRADE Exhibition and Convention Centre in Segambut.

The 2017 Games feature competitions in twenty events (men 7 events and women 13 events).

Events
The following events will be contested:
Artistic
Team all-round
Balance beam (event for women)
Floor
Horizontal bar (event for men)
Parallel bars (event for men)
Pommel horse (event for men)
Ring (event for men)
Uneven bars (event for women)
Vault
Rhythmic (events for women)
Group all-around
Individual all-round
Single apparatus
Mixed apparatus
Ball
Clubs
Hoop
Ribbon

Schedule

Participation

Participating nations

Medal summary

Medal table

Men's artistic

Women's artistic

Rhythmic

References

External links